Johannes Christoph Klinge (1851–1902) was a Baltic-German botanist.

He has described the following taxon:
 Aerides siamensis Klinge

References

1851 births
1902 deaths
19th-century German botanists
Baltic-German people